Plan International USA (Plan) is an international development and humanitarian nonprofit that partners with girls and their communities to fight for girls’ rights and end gender inequality. It is part of Plan International, a global nonprofit federation that works to tackle the root causes of poverty by working with communities, organizations and governments.

History 

Plan was founded in 1937 by British journalist John Langdon-Davies and refugee worker Eric Muggeridge. Originally named "Foster Parents Plan for Children in Spain", its aim was to provide food, accommodation, and education to children whose lives had been disrupted by the Spanish Civil War. During the Second World War, as "Foster Parents Plan for War Children", it worked with displaced children throughout war-torn Europe. By the 1970s, it had started working with children throughout Africa, Asia, Latin America, and the Caribbean.

Plan International USA was originally incorporated as "Foster Parents Plan, Inc." in 1939 in New York to connect U.S. donors to  sponsored children in developing countries. It was one of the first Plan International federation members. Its programs are implemented in more than 50 developing countries.

In 1974, the international parent organization, Foster Parents Plan shortened its name to "Plan International". In the 1990s the U.S. organization followed suit, changing its name "Childreach/Plan International" and eventually to "Plan International USA".

Finances and structure 

Plan International USA is a publicly funded American non-profit charitable organization, deriving its income from a combination of individual contributions and private and federal grants. The total operating revenue in 2021 for the organization was approximately $68.2 million. The headquarters are located in Providence, Rhode Island.

Shanna Marzilli was named President & CEO in January 2023. She proceeds the position being help by Mustafa Kudrati for 10 months and Dr. Tessie San Martin, who served for 11 years and stepped down in 2021. Other executive team members include Dave Cannata, Chief Financial Officer; Jim Peters, General Counsel; Erin Mulanaphy, Chief People & Culture Officer: and Jennifer Trainor, Chief Marketing Officer. Plan USA's board of directors has included at least one youth representative since 2015. In addition, the Plan USA Youth Advisory Board is a youth-led group that advises the organization on projects and participates in events. The Youth Advisory Board runs the annual Youth Leadership Academy, a yearlong program designed to train and support young activists as they create change in their communities.

Campaigns and Reports 

Because I Am a Girl was an international campaign addressing gender discrimination. Its goal  was to promote the rights of girls and bring millions of girls out of poverty around the world, promoting projects to improve opportunities for girls in education, health care, family planning, legal rights, and other areas.

In September 2018, the organization released "The State of Gender Equality for U.S. Adolescents". The report was covered by several media outlets including the New York Times, Washington Post, and Forbes. It reported how adolescents in the U.S. think about gender equality and what shapes those views. The report was named Media Relations campaign of the year by PR Daily.

In August 2019, the organization announced the largest individual gift in the organizations history. The gift will fund a program model called GirlEngage, which aims to challenge social and gender norms, send more girls to school and work to keep girls safe in their communities. This approach amplifies the voices of vulnerable and marginalized girls by including them in all stages of a project life-cycle – from defining the problem to program evaluation.

In October 2022, Plan USA’s We Are the Girls campaign launched in the U.S. to address gender inequality domestically and around the world. The campaign’s goal is to promote girls’ leadership to end gender inequality and fight its root causes through girl-led projects related to education, health, protection, youth equality and economic empowerment. The launch of the campaign was accompanied by partnerships with Unsplash, Z100 and UNIQLO to garner support for Plan’s $200 million goal and encourage people to sign the We Are the Girls pledge.

Programs 

In coordination with Plan International and its other chapters, Plan International USA helped fund and organize the following combined international programs and activities in 2022:

 52.2 million children supported through Plan’s work.
 1.2 million children were sponsored.
 Partnered with 31,865 organizations.
 Worked in 56,544 communities across 80+ countries.
 Implemented 81 disaster response programs, supporting more than 7.8 million girls.

Child sponsorship 

Plan's child sponsorship program links each sponsor to an individual child in one of more than 40 countries where Plan International has sponsorship programming. Sponsors contribute money and have an opportunity to correspond with the child and his or her family. Donations are not given directly to the child but are used to support projects for entire communities.

New York Times columnist Nicholas Kristof visited a child he sponsored in the Dominican Republic, a trip he wrote about in one of his columns, while pointing out the benefits of child sponsorship programs.

The effectiveness of the program was studied by RMIT University through an analysis "Changing Lives: An Analysis of Child Sponsorship Data". It looked at more than 12 million surveys from 2.7 million sponsored children over several years, finding that more children attend school in sponsored communities than in non-sponsored communities, that school attendance rises every year the program works in a community and most children have greater access to improved water and sanitation.

In popular culture 

The organization was featured in the 2002 film About Schmidt and Girl Rising in 2013. The organization is also featured in the book Half the Sky: Turning Oppression into Opportunity for Women Worldwide by Nicholas Kristof and Sheryl WuDunn, published in 2009.

References 

Children's charities based in the United States
Charities based in Rhode Island
International charities